The following lists events that happened during 1946 in Cape Verde.

Incumbents
Colonial governor: João de Figueiredo

Events

Births
Sérgio Ferreira, writer (d. 2006)

References

 
1946 in the Portuguese Empire
Years of the 20th century in Cape Verde
1940s in Cape Verde
Cape Verde
Cape Verde